Nils Jorgen Peaks is a group of small peaks about 6 nautical miles (11 km) northeast of Mount Schumacher on the Ahlmann Ridge in Queen Maud Land. Mapped by Norwegian cartographers from surveys and air photos by Norwegian-British-Swedish Antarctic Expedition (NBSAE) (1949–52) and air photos by the Norwegian expedition (1958–59). Named for Nils Jorgen Schumacher, senior meteorologist with the NBSAE.

Mountains of Queen Maud Land
Princess Martha Coast